Chiatti is a surname. Notable people with the surname include: 

Abigaille Bruschi-Chiatti ( 1855–after 1888), Italian soprano
Laura Chiatti (born 1982), Italian actress and singer
Luigi Chiatti (born 1968), Italian serial killer